The London, Midland and Scottish Railway (LMS) Sentinels 7160–7163, later renumbered 7180–7183 and by British Railways 47180–47183, was a class of small vertical boilered chain-driven shunting locomotives.

Overview 
They were built by Sentinel Waggon Works of Shrewsbury in 1930, makers Nos 8209–8212. 47180 was withdrawn in 1953, 47183 in 1955 and 47181 and 47182 in 1956. All were scrapped.

References

External links 
 Class SENT1 Details at Rail UK

Sentinel locomotives
0F
Railway locomotives introduced in 1930
Standard gauge steam locomotives of Great Britain
Scrapped locomotives
0-4-0T locomotives
Shunting locomotives